GullivAir is a Bulgarian airline headquartered in Sofia.

History
GullivAir received its operational license from Bulgarian authorities in September 2020 and started operations with a single Airbus A330-200 inherited from Shaheen Air with ad hoc charter services in autumn 2020. They have started regular scheduled charters from Bulgaria and Romania to long-haul destinations in the Dominican Republic and the Maldives from December 2020 and also applied to start flights to New York. The airline also announced plans to phase in additional Airbus A330s and ATR 72 aircraft.

GullivAir's first scheduled destination out of Sofia became Burgas. The inauguration flight took place on 15th of August 2021. The airline will inaugurate international flights to Skopje and Albania from the end of March 2022. The airline also plans adding domestic flights to Ruse.

Destinations

Fleet

As of July 2022, GullivAir operates the following aircraft:

References

External links
 Official website

Airlines of Bulgaria
Airlines established in 2016
Charter airlines